Beatriz at Dinner is a 2017 comedy-drama film directed by Miguel Arteta from a screenplay by Mike White. The film stars Salma Hayek, John Lithgow, Connie Britton, Jay Duplass, Amy Landecker, Chloë Sevigny, and David Warshofsky.

Beatriz at Dinner had its world premiere at the Sundance Film Festival on January 23, 2017, and was released in the United States on June 9, 2017, by Roadside Attractions and FilmNation Entertainment, and in Canada on June 16, 2017, by Elevation Pictures.

Plot
The film opens with a woman rowing a boat in a mangrove swamp where she encounters a white goat on the shore. Next, Beatriz Blanco, a masseuse, is shown waking up at her Altadena home amongst her various animals. She heads off to a cancer treatment center in Santa Monica where she helps patients undergoing chemotherapy with holistic treatments. 

After her shift, Beatriz drives to the Newport Beach home of an affluent client, Kathy, to give her a massage before her dinner party. During the massage, Beatriz tells Kathy that her neighbor killed one of her goats and becomes emotional. Later, when Beatriz unsuccessfully tries to start her car, she tells Kathy that a friend will come to repair it when he gets off work. Kathy invites Beatriz to stay for the dinner party. Kathy’s husband Grant privately expresses his reservations about Beatriz joining them because they are entertaining important business connections, but he ultimately relents.

The first guests to arrive are married couple Shannon and Alex, who are about to make a small fortune off of a business venture. Beatriz introduces herself with warm hugs, which the guests receive awkwardly. Doug Strutt, the guest of honor and a real estate tycoon, then arrives with his wife Jeana. Kathy introduces Beatriz to Jeana and explains how they met: Beatriz helped treat Tara, Kathy and Grant's daughter who is currently away at college. Kathy claims Beatriz’s alternative therapies helped Tara beat cancer. When Beatriz learns that her friend won't be able to come until morning, Kathy insists that she stay the night and asks her to sing a song for the guests after dinner. 

Interactions between Doug and Beatriz get off to a bad start with Doug mistaking her for one of the house staff members. Beatriz tells Doug he looks familiar to her and she might remember him from somewhere, and Doug tells her that because of his various businesses, it is possible she saw him in the news. During dinner, Beatriz begins to talk about her life and how she had to emigrate from Mexico when she was young. Doug asks her if she came to the country legally. All the guests, including Beatriz, drink wine during the dinner. At one point, Beatriz excuses herself to call a family member, asking if Doug was the man they protested back in Mexico. When she returns to the table, she asks Doug if he had a hotel in her home state of Guerrero. He says he does not recognize the name of the area, but mentions he has hotels located elsewhere in Mexico.

Beatriz tells him how the hotel built in her hometown promised jobs and opportunities for her community but ended up destroying it; her family lost their home and the police killed protesters. Doug points out that his new project is a shopping center, not a hotel, and assures her the only ones losing their homes might be a few birds. Trying to diffuse the escalating tension, Kathy invites everyone into the living room for dessert. Jeana reveals she and Doug will be going to South Africa in the next couple of days, but she is expecting to be bored since Doug will be out hunting all day. Doug brags about his hunting of animals while on a safari and passes around a phone with a photo of a dead rhinoceros he hunted to the other guests. Once the phone reaches Beatriz, she becomes infuriated, calls the act "disgusting",  and throws the mobile at Doug. Beatriz exits the room, with Kathy telling everyone she's had an emotional week. Doug laughs it off, saying not everyone can handle the graphic image.

An emotional Beatriz apologizes to Kathy for losing her cool and promises to make it up to her. Kathy recommends she go to bed early and stop drinking since she's had a tough week. Beatriz obliges her and goes upstairs to Tara's room. While continuing to drink wine, Beatriz Googles Doug on the computer, which reveals Doug's businesses have been involved in various controversies and legal problems. Beatriz then decides to rejoin the guests, who are now sitting outside, and brings a guitar with her to perform the song Kathy asked of her earlier. She sings a song titled "Las simples cosas," telling the guests it is about "how we always want to go back to the places where we loved life, but the old, simple things are now gone." After the song, Beatriz tells Doug she mistook him for someone else and he is not the man who bought land in her hometown after all. She and Doug begin to trade words, with Doug insisting on the idea of manifest destiny, and Beatriz arguing that instead of hunting and killing, he should try healing. When the argument escalates and Beatriz calls out the privilege of the guests, an upset Grant tells her she needs to leave immediately and he will call a tow truck for her car. As Beatriz waits for the truck, Kathy attempts to give Beatriz money, but she declines.

Doug follows Beatriz to the steps outside the house and tells her that no matter what, everything is going to die anyway, so she might as well enjoy herself and lighten up. Beatriz again says she's certain she knows him from somewhere. When the truck arrives, Beatriz gets in, but before the truck can leave, she says she has forgotten something. Beatriz goes to Grant’s office and picks up a letter opener, then walks into the foyer where she sees Doug talking on the phone. She charges at him and stabs him in the throat, and the guests are left in horror at the sight of a dying Doug. However, the sequence is revealed to be a fantasy, as Beatriz drops the letter opener and walks back to the tow truck. When the truck driver asks Beatriz if she is OK, she tells him, "That man killed my goat." As the truck later drives alongside the ocean, she demands the driver pull over. She descends down the rocks and makes it to the beach, gradually walking into the water and submerging herself. She reawakens in her boat on the mangrove swamp of the film's opening, revealing that the opening sequence is actually a reference to the final one where her murdered goat has gone and where she has now "swum" to.

Cast

Production

Development 
Mike White was inspired to write the script after the 2015 killing of Cecil the Lion. Said White, "I'm an animal person. I'd heard about that story, and it just hit me in the gut. I had thought to myself: If I was at a dinner party with a guy like that, and he told me he was going to Africa and hunt a lion, what would I do? Would I flip out on him? Grab a butter knife and leap across the table?" The character of Beatriz was written specifically for Salma Hayek, who was a fan of White’s show Enlightened.

Casting 
In August 2016, it was announced Connie Britton, John Lithgow, Chloë Sevigny, Jay Duplass, and Nina Arianda would be joining the film’s cast, and that Miguel Arteta, a frequent collaborator of White’s, would direct. It was also announced Christine Vachon would produce under her Killer Films banner, as would Aaron L. Gilbert under his Bron Studios banner. David Hinjosa and Pamela Koffler also served as producers on the film, alongside Jason Cloth, Richard McConnell, Brad Feinstein, and Lewis Hendler, who served as executive producers. It was later revealed Amy Landecker had joined the cast of the film, replacing Arianda.

Filming
Principal photography began on August 15, 2016 in Los Angeles, California. Production concluded on September 3, 2016. Mark Mothersbaugh composed the film's score.

Release
The film had its world premiere at the Sundance Film Festival on January 23, 2017. Shortly after, Roadside Attractions, FilmNation Entertainment and Elevation Pictures acquired U.S. and Canadian distribution rights to the film, respectively. It was given a limited release on June 9, 2017 in the US, with a wider expansion beginning June 23. In Canada, the film was released on June 16, 2017.

Critical response
The film holds a 75% approval rating on review aggregator website Rotten Tomatoes, based on 132 reviews with an average score of 6.50/10. The site's critical consensus reads, "Beatriz at Dinner offers timely social commentary enlivened by powerful, layered performances from Salma Hayek and John Lithgow." On Metacritic, the film holds a score of 68 out of 100, based on 36 reviews, indicating "generally favorable reviews".

Owen Gleiberman of Variety gave the film a positive review, calling the film a "small-scale but elegantly deft squirmfest that features a luminous performance by Salma Hayek." Eric Kohn of Indiewire.com also gave the film a positive review, writing: "White's script is well crafted as a grim chamber piece, but it falls short of developing its central tension beyond its initial implications."

Leslie Felperin of The Hollywood Reporter gave the film a negative review, saying the film is a "flawed work, too broad and scattershot to skewer its deserving targets with the precision necessary for the task."

Political commentary 
The script was written in the summer of 2015 when Donald Trump was still considering running for the United States presidency. At the time, White thought the possibility of Trump being elected to office was unlikely, and so did not necessarily envision the film as a strong allegory to Trump. After Trump was elected president in November 2016, the film took on a new significance as a critique of Trump’s rhetoric and policies about immigration and Mexican immigrants, in particular. After the film premiered at Sundance in January 2017, it became seen as “the first great film of the Trump era." Multiple critics pointed to the character of Doug as a counterpart to Trump, as both are real estate magnates and display hostility towards immigrants from Mexico. The filmmakers acknowledged the similarities but maintained the character is not a direct reference to Trump.

Accolades

References

External links
 
 
 

2017 films
2017 comedy-drama films
2017 independent films
American comedy-drama films
American independent films
American satirical films
Canadian comedy-drama films
Canadian independent films
English-language Canadian films
Films directed by Miguel Arteta
Films produced by Christine Vachon
Films scored by Mark Mothersbaugh
Films with screenplays by Mike White
Killer Films films
Bron Studios films
Films about parties
Films about race and ethnicity
Films about social class
Films about social issues
Films about the upper class
2010s English-language films
2010s American films
2010s Canadian films
2010s satirical films